140 (10 per weight class) athletes will qualify to compete in judo. The top ten nations after a series of qualification tournaments will qualify. If Mexico fails to be in the top ten it will take the place of the tenth place country.

Qualification summary

60kg Men

66kg Men

73kg Men

81kg Men

90kg Men

100kg Men

+100kg Men

48kg Women

52kg Women

57kg Women

63kg Women

70kg Women

78kg Women

+78kg Women

Countries indicated with a strike have decline their quota spot.

References

Qualification
2011
Qualification for the 2011 Pan American Games
American Games, Qualification